A convent is a community of priests, religious brothers, religious sisters or nuns, or the building used by such a community.

Convent or convento may also refer to:

Places
 Convent, Louisiana, U.S.
 Convent Gallery, an art museum in Australia
 Convento Building (Mission San Fernando), on the U.S. National Register of Historic Places
 Hotel El Convento, a hotel in Puerto Rico
 Convento, a town in Piedmont, Italy

Schools
 Dominican Convent High School, Harare, Zimbabwe
 Dominican Convent High School, Bulawayo, Zimbabwe
 Dominican Convent Primary School, Bulawayo, Zimbabwe
 Dominican Convent Primary School, Harare, Zimbabwe

Other uses
 Convent (band), a project of Emilie Autumn

See also
 The Convent (disambiguation)